Bardia Sadrenoori (born 2 May 1968), also spelled Bardia Sadr-e-noori, is an Iranian pianist, chamber musician, music improvisator and author. His style is classical Persian piano as musical improvisator. he has a lot of experience performing and collaborating with other musicians and artists. In France, he performed for the first time with a non-equal-tempered piano in January 2022 in Rennes. In Iran, he is the founder and director of Radnoandish cultural and artistic institute, as well as organizer of festivals of art and concerts.

Biography
Bardia Sadrenoori was born in 1968 in Rasht, Iran, he began his piano at the age of 10. He started playing classical piano by the supervision of "Fahim Momtazi". Since early ages, he accepted genre of piano playing close to Classical music, nonetheless his tendency started to be curiosity on his favorite genre of playing piano as Persian traditional music. Therefore, he had introduced to "Kiomars Parsay" to take a humble advantage of learning Persian traditional music. Mehr News Agency described him as "an artist of exceptional promises."

Education
Sadrenoori attended at Amirkabir University of Technology in Tehran in MSc of Industrial Engineering whereas by next few following year of his graduation meanwhile, he was recording his debut album he decided to pursue his career as finally and signature of his education in PhD of Strategic Management as well as afterwards he published his own Blueprint on promoting classical music of each nation by publishing his master work on book "strategic study for national music."

Career

Since 1987 Sadrenoori is particularly committed to classical music tendency to Iranian traditional songs. He started as soloist in several premiere of his performances even though, this was start for Sadrenoori to experience both playing chamber music and duet which has augmented technicality skills in his playing as well as both musical and social skills that differed Sadrenoori from skills he has for playing solo or symphonic works. Bardia Sadrenoori founded and established his own chamber music group called"Mehr avar"().

Performances

His works in classical piano playing had become a limelight in eyes of the major Iranian musicians, composers, artists and singers which led him to an honorable invitation for collaborating in chamber music performing such as duetsand music ensembles during his young ages, for instance he contributed with:

 "KHONYA Musical Group" under directorship of Pari Maleki 
 "Simurgh Classical chamber ensembles"  under directorship of Afshin Qarshi
 Mehr National Orchestra under directorship of Nasser Izadi 
 Piano duo in collaboration with Sepas Sadrenoori

Classical chamber musical ensemble

Classical musical ensemble 
"Mehr National Orchestra" under leadership of Naser Izadi. ."

Instrumental Musical ensemble

Solo

Discography
The albums listed below are from his Solo Persian Classical Piano Improvisation: 

His outstanding piano playing style led him to several collaborations with major and well known Iranian musicians including;

Recognition

In November 2014, "The Navay e Khorram Honorary Award Festival""  under Bardia Sadrenoori Management, as the same aim, objective and vision which Homayoun Khorram had been always dream of for Iranian musicians and art lovers. Despite of Bardia sadrenoori'a efforts and works towards classical national Iranian music he kept encouraging communities in order to promote young talents to engage in such activity as improving classical music. Moreover, on 2018 the 5th anniversary of "navay e khorram festival" has received an enormous number of new entry level of participants such as conductors and musicians of age between 8 and 15 which has been another limelight as global awareness

References

External links 
 Iranian pianist makes video to observe World Day against Child Labor
 Homayoun Khorram Music Hymns at Vahdat Hall
 Bardia Sadreoori om Duet with Nader Golchin
 Bardia Sadrenoori' Online Music Stream on Beeptunes.com
 Bardia Sadrenoori's online Music Stream on Soundcloud 
 Bardia Sadrenoori on LikedIn

1968 births
Living people
People from Rasht
Iranian pianists
Persian classical musicians
Iranian classical musicians
Persian classical music
Amirkabir University of Technology
21st-century pianists
Musical improvisation
Classical and art music traditions